Susan Manchester (born June 22, 1987) is an American politician who has served in the Ohio House of Representatives from the 84th district since 2019.

State Representative Susan Manchester is serving her first term in the Ohio House of Representatives. She represents the 84th District, which encompasses Mercer County, as well as portions of Auglaize, Darke and Shelby counties.

Growing up on the family farm in Waynesfield, Ohio, Manchester went on to graduate from The Ohio State University in 2010 with degrees in Psychology and Political Science. There, she also participated in Campus Crusade for Christ (now Cru) and mentored young women.

Prior to being elected to the House, she worked in Washington, D.C. for Congressman Jim Jordan, where she focused on policies such as agriculture, health care, business and education. Upon returning to Ohio in 2016, Manchester took a position with a non-profit organization focused on mentoring kids.

Rep. Manchester lives in Waynesfield.

In 2019, Manchester co-sponsored legislation that would ban abortion in Ohio and criminalize what they called "abortion murder". Doctors who performed abortions in cases of ectopic pregnancy and other life-threatening conditions would be exempt from prosecution only if they "[took] all possible steps to preserve the life of the unborn child, while preserving the life of the woman. Such steps include, if applicable, attempting to reimplant an ectopic pregnancy into the woman's uterus". Reimplantation of an ectopic pregnancy is not a recognized or medically feasible procedure.

References

1987 births
Living people
Republican Party members of the Ohio House of Representatives
Ohio State University College of Arts and Sciences alumni
Women state legislators in Ohio
21st-century American politicians
21st-century American women politicians